Wojnów may refer to the following places in Poland:
Wojnów, Świętokrzyskie Voivodeship (south-central Poland)
Wojnów, Masovian Voivodeship (east-central Poland)